was the 5th Attorney General of Japan in 1898-1904 and the member of the House of Peers. He was born in Hiroshima City, and worked as a prosecutor for some local courts.

References 

Japanese prosecutors
Members of the House of Peers (Japan)
Politicians from Hiroshima Prefecture
1852 births
1910 deaths
Prosecutors General of Japan